Yandex.Taxi (Russian: Яндекс.Такси) is an international company owned by Russian IT-giant Yandex and that operates taxi aggregation and food tech businesses across Russia, CIS, Eastern Europe, Africa and the Middle East. The company is among the world's leading developers of self-driving technology.

Yandex.Taxi was founded by Yandex N.V., a Russian multinational company that operates a search engine, an Internet portal, and about 70 other online services in multiple countries. Sometimes described as the «Russian Google, Amazon, Uber and Spotify», Yandex has been listed on the NASDAQ since 2011. The company focuses on developing machine learning-based technologies. Yandex.Taxi is a separate, private limited liability company within Yandex Group, incorporated in the Netherlands as Yandex.Taxi B.V.

The Yandex.Taxi ride-hailing services operates in more than 1,000 cities, including 300 large cities across Russia, Belarus, Moldova, Armenia, Georgia, Kyrgyzstan, Kazakhstan, Uzbekistan, Latvia, Estonia, Lithuania, Serbia, Israel, Ivory Coast, Finland, Ghana, Romania, Norway, and Bolivia. More than 700,000 drivers are connected to the network.

The food-tech arm of the company includes food delivery service Yandex.Eats, the super-fast grocery delivery service Yandex.Lavka, and the meal-kit service Yandex.Chef, previously known as Partiya Edy (Russian: "Food Party"). As of 2019, the Yandex.Lavka food delivery service is available through the Yandex.Taxi app, and operates in Russia, Uzbekistan as well as Kazakhstan.

In 2020, Yandex.Taxi was reportedly developing AI-infused proprietary hardware and software for its vehicles that monitors drivers’ attention levels, as well as a facial recognition system that determines the identity of the person behind the wheel.

In April 2022, Yandex.Taxi was banned in Estonia due to the Russian government's requirement that it share users' personal data with the government.  Estonia encouraged other EU countries to sanction the company as well.

History 
Yandex.Taxi launched in Moscow, Russia in 2011. At the start of the project, it connected about 1,000 drivers from 11 taxi companies.

The service was first introduced as a mobile app for Android and iOS, and the site was launched on 28 June 2012.

In 2012, Yandex.Taxi started charging a commission on rides booked through its service.

Tigran Khudaverdyan took charge of the service in 2014. He remained in charge when it spun off as a separate company in December 2015.

In June 2017, Yandex.Taxi released a video demonstrating its driverless car technology. The prototype vehicle was a Toyota Prius hybrid hatchback equipped with an Nvidia GTX graphics processor and a LiDAR optical distance sensor by Velodyne.

Businesses and operations merger with Uber 
On 13 July 2017, Yandex.Taxi and Uber signed an agreement to merge their businesses and operations in Armenia, Azerbaijan, Belarus, Georgia, Kazakhstan, and Russia. The merger completed in February 2018. Yandex invested $100 million and Uber invested $225 million in the new structure. The new company had an estimated valuation of $3.8 billion. According to estimates from different investment banks in December 2018, Yandex.Taxi's market value has increased, varying between from $4.4 billion and $6.2 billion. 59.3% of the consolidated company named MLU B.V. belongs to Yandex, and 36.6% belongs to Uber. The remaining 4.1% belongs to the employees. Tigran Khudaverdyan retained leadership of the consolidated company.

On May 22, 2019, Yandex announced the appointment of Tigran Khudaverdyan to the newly created position of Deputy Chief Executive Officer of the Yandex group with Daniil Shuleyko promoted to the position of chief executive officer of MLU B.V.

Food tech division 
In December 2017, Yandex.Taxi purchased 100% shares of Foodfox, a food delivery service in Moscow. After the merge of Uber and Yandex.Taxi in March 2018, Uber Eats and Foodfox combined their services to become Yandex.Eats. As of March 2019 the new company is represented in 24 cities throughout Russia, with more than 8000 restaurants on the platform. In December 2018 Yandex.Eats completed 1 million orders.

In 2019, Yandex.Eats launched a super-fast food delivery services called Yandex.Lavka that delivers food to customers in under 15 minutes. The online service relies on small warehouses across Moscow and St. Petersburg stocked with about 2,000 items and uses bike couriers to deliver orders. As of 2019, the Yandex.Lavka food delivery service is available through the Yandex.Taxi app, and operates in Russia and Kazakhstan.

In October 2018, Yandex.Taxi acquired another food tech company, a meal kit service called Partiya Edy ("Food Party"), now renamed as Yandex.Chef, which operates in Moscow and St. Petersburg.

Autonomous taxis 

Yandex has developed its own autonomous driverless cars for use as taxis. The first model available to the public is a heavily modified Toyota Prius with three lidar units, six radar units, and six cameras and a GNSS sensor for navigation, with Intel CPUs and NVIDIA GPUs using a Linux operating system. In November 2017, Yandex released a video of its AV winter tests, in which the car drove successfully along snowy roads of Moscow.

On 29 May 2018, free demo rides were offered to the public at Yet Another Conference.  Yandex reported that 700 passengers were given rides through the 10 hours of the demo. In June 2018, a Yandex driverless car completed a long-distance test ride in fully autonomous mode, traveling 780 km in about 11 hours.

Yandex's robo-taxi service was launched in trial mode in August 2018 in the university town of Innopolis in the Republic of Tatarstan. Service was free during this trial, and a Yandex engineer occupied the front passenger seat as a safety observer while the driver's seat remained empty. In November 2018, it was reported that the company had given its 1000th self-driving passenger ride. In February 2020, it was reported that over 5,000 autonomous passenger rides were made in Innopolis.

The Yandex driverless car was presented to the international public at the CES 2019 innovation conference in Las Vegas. At the end of 2018, Yandex obtained a license to use these vehicles on public roads in Nevada, one of the few American states where driverless cars are allowed. Unlike other prototypes demonstrated at the exhibition, the cars were circulating the streets of the city without any human control. In January 2020 Yandex provided autonomous rides for CES guests for the second time.

In December 2018, the company got a permission from the Israeli Transportation Ministry to test its driverless car on public roads without a human safety driver at the wheel. This makes Israel the third country where the company is testing its self-driving vehicle.

In March 2019, Yandex and Hyundai signed an agreement to work on autonomous car systems. The aim was to develop a platform for autonomous vehicles for level 4 and level 5, the categories of automation defined as requiring limited to no human intervention. In July 2019 Hyundai Mobis and Yandex presented the self-driving Hyundai Sonata 2020 as the first result of their collaboration.

In October 2019 Yandex announced that its self-driving cars had passed 1 million miles in fully autonomous driving since it started testing the technology. In February 2020, Yandex doubled its mileage with 2 million miles passed.

On October 22, 2019, the Michigan Department of Transportation (MDOT) selected Yandex and four other providers of highly automated vehicles for the 2020 NAIAS Michigan Mobility Challenge. Ten Yandex self-driving sedans will provide public rides in downtown Detroit during the Autoshow in June 2020.

In November 2019, the company presented its autonomous delivery robot Yandex.Rover, based on the same self-driving technology the company is using for its autonomous cars. As part of the initial testing phase, a fleet of Yandex.Rover is operating on the Yandex campus in Moscow, transporting small packages from one building to another.

In December 2019 Yandex introduced two lidars that it designed in-house. One is a solid state lidar with a 120-degree field of vision and the second is a rotating one that provides a 360-degree view of its surroundings. The company claims that using its own lidars will help Yandex save up to 75% on the cost of sensors, which are currently one of the most expensive parts of an autonomous vehicle. Yandex's lidars are deployed in its test fleet in and around Moscow.

In March 2020, Yandex announced plans to launch a worldwide fleet of robotaxis using its driverless car software within the next few years, with a licence to begin testing in the United States from June 2020.

Features

Technologies 
To estimate a vehicle's arrival time and the price of a ride, Yandex.Taxi uses two technologies developed by parent company Yandex: Yandex.Maps and Yandex.Navigator. This technology calculates routes based on live and forecasted traffic conditions. The service can recommend a pick-up point near to a user's location. Moving across the street may save time and money on the ride, for example.

Depending on the country, the price for a ride may be calculated with an automatic surcharge rate. This rate applies when the number of people in a certain area exceeds the number of available cars.

Since April 2017, riders know the price of their ride in advance. The price doesn't change, even if the driver gets stuck in traffic jam or takes a detour.  This feature is now available in almost every country where the service operates. In those countries where it isn't, the app calculates an estimated price that may differ from the final price.

Safety 
Yandex.Taxi works with partners who are authorized to provide transportation services. Depending on a country's laws, these can be taxi companies, taxi stations, licensed carriers, individual entrepreneurs, or other legal entities who have appropriate permissions. The company engages drivers training to use the Taximeter mobile app and communicate properly with passengers. Those who successfully complete the training program get a higher rating, which is an advantage for receiving orders.

In November 2018, Yandex.Taxi announced a speed control project that's currently implemented in Russia, Belarus and Kazakhstan. The system monitors a car's speed and sends warnings to drivers who exceed the speed limit. Following the launch of the system, speeding among Yandex drivers reportedly dropped 12-fold. Similar to Uber, Yandex uses telematic data to monitor drivers’ behavior on roads and may suspend drivers who display erratic or aggressive behavior.

To ensure safety for passengers and drivers, Yandex.Taxi controls the amount of time drivers can spend working. After several hours of continuous work, they stop receiving orders until they have enough rest. The company is developing an attention control system to decrease the number of road accidents caused by human factors. The AI system looks at such factors as blinking and yawning to detect when a driver is tired or distracted. Yandex.Taxi is the only online car booking service with a system like this so far. In addition, Yandex is developing a facial recognition system to prevent fraud by detecting who is behind the wheel.

Yandex uses a remote quality check (RQC) system to ensure its drivers' vehicles meet quality standards: these include damage-free exteriors, clean empty trunks, and available child safety seats (if the driver is authorized to accept ride requests with children). Drivers are regularly asked to take photos of their vehicles and upload them through the Yandex.Taxi app, after which the pictures are evaluated for quality standards and drivers are asked to resolve any issues before they can continue to accept rides.

Global expansion 

As of 2022, Yandex.Taxi operates in more than 1,000 cities, include 300 large cities in Russia, Belarus, Armenia, Kyrgyzstan, Moldova, Georgia, Kazakhstan, Latvia, Lithuania, Estonia, Uzbekistan, Serbia. In addition to the taxi service, in some countries, Yandex.Taxi operates food tech, food delivery and cargo platforms.

Belarus 
The service launched on 25 February 2016. It started in Minsk, but now operates in all six regional centers and multiple cities in the country. In March 2019 the service introduced an insurance product for riders and drivers connected to the service.

Armenia 
Operating in 15 of its cities, Yandex.Taxi has one of its most visible presences in Armenia. It started operating in Yerevan on 1 July 2016. In 2017, the service sponsored a computer programming school for high schoolers in Gyumri and Vanadzor.

Kazakhstan 
Kazakhstan is one of the biggest international markets for Yandex.Taxi. Launched in the biggest city Almaty on 28 July 2016, Yandex.Taxi was serving 20 cities by September 2018. On 3 September 2018, Yandex.Taxi introduced an insurance product for riders and drivers connected to the service. Yandex.Taxi also provides corporate taxi services in Kazakhstan. In 2020 Kazakhstan became the first foreign market for the Yandex.Eats food delivery service.

Georgia 
The launch in Georgia on 28 August 2016 was accompanied by scandals pertaining to another Yandex service, Yandex.Maps. The Russian version of Yandex.Maps marks the territories of Abkhazia and South Ossetia as independent countries  while Georgian law defines these territories as parts of Georgia. Given that Yandex.Maps wasn't localized for Georgia, everyone saw only the Russian version. Yandex.Taxi marked these territories to comply with Georgian law, unlike Yandex. Maps. Despite the update fact, many locals boycotted the new service. Yandex.Taxi continued operations and still works in present day, adding two more cities to its Georgian network: Batumi and Rustavi.

Moldova 
Yandex.Taxi launched in Chișinău on 24 July 2017. In 2020 it expanded to the city of Bălți.

Kyrgyzstan 
Kyrgyzstan is the second country in Central Asia in which Yandex began to operate. Yandex.Taxi was launched on 9 November 2017 in Bishkek, then later in Osh.

Latvia 
Latvia was the first Baltic country and the first EU member where Yandex.Taxi started operations. It launched on 15 March 2018, is leaving in March 2022.

Uzbekistan 
Yandex.Taxi operates in Tashkent, the capital of Uzbekistan, as well as in Fergana and Margilan. The service entered the local market on 4 April 2018.

Estonia 

Yandex.Taxi launched in the Estonian capital Tallinn on 1 May 2018. It also operates in Tartu and the Idu-Virumaa region.  Yandex.Taxi services is  ceased in Estonia as of April 11, 2022, due to the Russian government's collection of user data. Estonian Prime Minister Kaja Kallas and IT and foreign trade minister Andres Sutt said the move related to national security, given that Yandex requires the provision of personal data which would be held in Russia and which Russian security services, including the FSB, have the ability to access, following a recent decision in Russia.

Serbia 
Serbia is the first country outside the former Soviet republics where Yandex.Taxi began to operate. It launched in Belgrade on 5 June 2018.

Lithuania 
Just after the Lithuanian launch of Yandex.Taxi on 26 July 2018, the country's authorities warned citizens against using the service in order to protect their personal data. Lithuania's National Cyber Security Center (NCSC) highlighted that "it is especially important that this app isn’t used on the devices of Lithuanian civil servants, officials, or national defense system employees." Yandex.Taxi responded that it "processes and stores EU user data strictly according to EU regulations, GDPR in particular,"  and that the service is "open and ready for any necessary checks.."  Despite the NCSC's accusations, authorities from two other Baltic states — Latvia and Estonia — did not speak out against Yandex.Taxi.

Lithuanian authorities did not ultimately impose restrictions on the service, and Yandex.Taxi works in the capital city of Vilnius and Kaunas.

Revenue and profitability 
Yandex.Taxi turned profitable in fall 2018 and posted rapid revenue growth ahead of an anticipated public offering. According to other reports, profitability was posted by the entire segment comprising Yandex's ride-hailing division and food tech businesses, including Yandex.Eats and the grocery delivery service Yandex.Lavka. Yandex.Taxi accounted for 20% of Yandex revenues in Q1 2019, showing 145% revenue growth year-on-year. This has made it an outlier in terms of profitability among other ride-hailing services.

For 2019, Yandex posted revenues of nearly RUB 38 billion (around $520 million) from services related to its taxi segment, an increase of 97% from the previous year.

Concerns

Yandex and US sanctions 
On 29 January 2018 the United States Treasury Department issued a report listing senior political figures and oligarchs in Russia who are reportedly closely linked to the Russian government and hold certain political power. Yandex founder Arkadiy Volozh was named along with 95 Russian businessmen. The list was revealed to have been copied from the list of Russians on the 2017 Forbes billionaires list.  Arkadiy Volozh has not been included in any country's list of personal or business sanctions.

Permissions controversy 
In 2018, Yandex.Taxi came under scrutiny in Lithuania and Finland after Lithuanian authorities warned the app could be collecting users' personal data. Lithuanian authorities did not ultimately impose restrictions on the service, while the Finnish Communications Regulatory Authority found that Yandex's terms of service were essentially the same as Uber's. To clarify its data use procedure, Yandex.Taxi published a detailed explainer on the data that its app collects from users, along with instructions on how to turn individual permissions on and off.

Sharing user data with police 
In February 2020, Russian news website Baza reported that Yandex.Taxi had disclosed the travel history of an investigative journalist to Moscow police without a court order. The company responded that it was legally compelled to hand over the data under Russia's “operative-search activities” law,  which does not require a court decision to request ride histories.

See also 
 Uber
 Lyft
 DiDi

References

External links

 Yandex.Taxi: Official Website

Yandex
Transport companies established in 2011
Ridesharing companies
Road transport in Russia
Online companies of Russia
Transport companies of Russia